Albert is an electoral constituency in the Belize District of Belize.

History
The Albert constituency was created for the 1961 general election as part of a major nationwide redistricting.  Albert is named after the principal street (Albert Street) within its jurisdiction.

Albert Constituency is home to the headquarters of most of Belize's banks, Belize City's major stores, The Supreme Court of Belize City, The Bliss Center for the Performing Arts, The Belize City House of Culture, Battlefield Park, the Belize City Commercial Center, and several government offices.

Location and geographic setting
Albert, often referred to locally as Albert Division, is located entirely within the boundaries of Belize City, and is one of 10 constituencies in the Belize District that fall within its city limits. Albert is considered the downtown area of Belize City and is located on the eastern part of the city's southside.

Albert is bounded by the Caribbean Sea to the east and south, Haulover Creek to the north, and the constituencies of Mesopotamia and Queen's Square to the west. The historic Belize City Swing Bridge, which crosses Haulover Creek, connects Albert with the Fort George constituency. Albert is Belize's smallest constituency in terms of area.

Politics
In an era in which the People's United Party overwhelmingly dominated Belizean national politics, Philip Goldson of the National Independence Party first won Albert in 1965. He held the seat as a member of the NIP, then the UDP and finally the NABR until his retirement in 1998. Goldson was the sole opposition member in the Belize House during much of the 1960s and early 1970s.

In 1998 Mark Espat won the constituency for the PUP for the first time in 37 years, defeating the UDP's Tom Morrison. Espat was re-elected by comfortable margins until his retirement in 2012.

Albert is currently represented in the House of Representatives of Belize by the UDP's Tracy Taegar- Panton, who is Minister of State with responsibility for Investment, Trade and Commerce.

Area Representatives

Elections

See also
Districts of Belize
Constituencies of Belize
Politics of Belize
Belize
Belize City

References

External links
Belize Elections & Boundaries Department's Map of Belize District Constituencies
Ministry of National Development, Investment & Culture

Political divisions in Belize
British Honduras Legislative Assembly constituencies established in 1961
Populated places in Belize District
Albert (Belize House constituency)
Central business districts
1961 establishments in British Honduras